The Church of the Holy Mother of God (is an Armenian Apostolic church in Bolshiye Saly village, Myasnikovsky District, Rostov Oblast, Russia. It is also officially declared as an architectural monument of regional significance of cultural heritage of Russia.

History 
In 1848 the believers of Bolshiye Saly, many of whom were Armenians, decided to build a brick church. In 1860, its construction began and was finished and consecrated by Catholicos George IV 7 years later. It was built on the project if Taganrog architect N. Muratov.

In 1938 the church was closed and its property was sold. During World War II, the church building was damaged and later was turned into a granary.

From 2001 to 2008, the church was being renovated. In 2008 it was consecrated again by Catholicos Karekin II. In 2011, a memorial cross was erected in honor of church clergy who fell victims to Soviet repressions.

Architecture 
A special feature of the church architecture is the absence of porticoes in front of the northern and southern facades, as well as at the eastern facade of the altar apse. Instead of porticoes, in the wall of this part, there are arranged three exedras, with the middle one serving as an altar.

Gallery

References

Churches in Rostov Oblast
Armenian Apostolic churches in Russia
Cultural heritage monuments of regional significance in Rostov Oblast